Hiragishi Station is the name of two train stations in Hokkaidō, Japan:

 Hiragishi Station (Sapporo)
 Hiragishi Station (Akabira)